Lean on Pete is a 2017 British coming-of-age drama film written and directed by Andrew Haigh, based on the novel of the same name by Willy Vlautin. It stars Charlie Plummer, Chloë Sevigny, Travis Fimmel and Steve Buscemi, and follows a 15-year-old boy who begins to work at a stable and befriends an ailing racehorse.

It was screened in the main competition section of the 74th Venice International Film Festival, where it won the Marcello Mastroianni Award for Best Young Actor or Actress for Plummer. It was released in the United States on 6 April 2018, by A24, before opening in the United Kingdom on 4 May 2018, by Curzon Artificial Eye. It received highly positive critical reviews, with praise going towards its direction, screenplay, cinematography, and Plummer's performance. The National Board of Review named it one of the ten best independent films of 2018.

Plot
While out on a morning run to a race track, Charley Thompson, a 15-year-old living with his single father Ray in Portland, Oregon, finds casual work caring for an aging racehorse named Lean On Pete. Pete's owner, Del, is an ornery man who assigns all the grunt work of caring for horses to Charley but attempts to bond by gifting Charley a pair of boots and teaching him table manners. Charley opens up about not knowing his birth mother, and how his father does not let him see Aunt Margy, Charley's only maternal figure.

One night, a Samoan man breaks into Charley's home and attacks Ray for sleeping with his wife. Ray is pushed through a glass door and the shards embed themselves in his stomach. He is taken to the hospital where a nurse informs Charley that Ray is suffering from a serious infection caused by his wounds. Despite Charley's insistence at staying by his side, Ray encourages Charley to continue his job with Del.

Del's top jockey, Bonnie, races with Pete and wins but notices that Pete is getting too old for racing and will soon be sold in Mexico to be slaughtered. Upon returning home from the race, Charley is informed by the attending nurse that Ray succumbed to his infection and died. The nurse gifts him Ray's belt but Charley escapes before Social Services can be called to collect him. The following night, Pete loses his race and is sold off. Charley confronts Del and Bonnie, who collectively shrug off Charley's attempt to buy Pete. Charley takes Del's keys and steals Pete, along with Del's truck, and heads for Wyoming in search of his Aunt Margy.

After a few days on the road, Charley soon runs out of money and resorts to siphoning gas and dining-and-dashing in order to survive. The truck breaks down on the highway and he continues on foot through the desert with Pete as his only source of company. Together, they stumble upon the home of Mike and Dallas, two Army veterans who offer Charley food and shelter. Charley refills his water supply and leaves in the middle of the night. The next day, Pete is spooked by motorcycles and runs out into the road where he is struck by a car and killed. Charley mourns Pete's death and flees the scene before he can be apprehended by police.

After arriving in a new town, Charley breaks into a house in search of water and to launder his clothes. He wanders the streets as a homeless youth before being taken in by a homeless couple named Silver and Martha; Silver scoffs at Charley's attempts to find work. Despite his disheveled appearance, Charley finds work as a house painter and saves up enough money to get to Wyoming. Silver attacks Charley for his money and kicks him out of their shared trailer. In retaliation, Charley steals a crowbar and beats Silver before taking his money back and running away. He buys a bus ticket and arrives in Laramie, Wyoming. He goes to the town's only public library and reunites with his Aunt Margy.

That night, Charley visits Aunt Margy's room after struggling to fall asleep. He confesses the crimes he committed throughout his journey and reveals he suffers from nightmares surrounding the deaths of both Pete and Ray. Aunt Margy consoles Charley as he bursts into tears. Some time later, Charley goes on a morning run through town and stops to admire his new neighborhood.

Cast
 Charlie Plummer as Charley Thompson, Ray’s son
 Travis Fimmel as Ray Thompson, Charley’s father
 Chloë Sevigny as Bonnie, a jockey
 Steve Buscemi as Del Montgomery, a horse trainer
 Steve Zahn as Silver
 Amy Seimetz as Lynn, Ray’s love interest
 Alison Elliott as Aunt Margy
 Justin Rain as Mike
 Lewis Pullman as Dallas
 Frank Gallegos as Santiago
 Julia Prud'homme as Ruby
 Kurt Conroyd as Nurse
 Bob Olin as Mr. Kendall
 Teyah Hartley as Laurie
 Rachael Perrell Fosket as Martha
 Jason Rouse as Mitch

Production
In May 2015, it was announced Andrew Haigh would write and direct the film, based upon the novel of the same name with Tristan Goligher to produce the film under his The Bureau banner, alongside Film4 Productions. In July 2016, Steve Buscemi joined the cast of the film. That same month, Charlie Plummer, Chloë Sevigny, and Travis Fimmel joined the cast of the film. In September 2016, Steve Zahn, Amy Seimetz and Thomas Mann joined the cast of the film.

James Edward Barker composed the film's score.

Filming
Principal photography began on 13 August 2016, and took place in Portland and Burns, Oregon. Filming concluded on 10 September 2016. Among the locations was Portland Meadows racetrack, named Portland Downs in the film.

Post-production
During post-production on the film, Thomas Mann's role was removed from the final cut.

Release
In May 2016, A24 and Curzon Artificial Eye acquired U.S and U.K distribution rights, respectively. The film had its world premiere at the Venice Film Festival on 1 September 2017. It also screened at the Toronto International Film Festival on 10 September 2017 and the BFI London Film Festival on 5 October 2017.

The film was initially scheduled to be released in the United States on 30 March 2018, however it was pushed back a week to 6 April, and was released in the United Kingdom on 4 May 2018.

Reception

Critical response

Lean on Pete received highly positive critical reviews. On Rotten Tomatoes, the film holds an approval rating of 90% based on 188 reviews, with an average rating of 7.9/10. The website's critical consensus reads, "Lean on Pete avoids mawkish melodrama, offering an empathetic yet clear-eyed portrayal of a young man at a crossroads that confirms Charlie Plummer as a major talent." On Metacritic, the film has a weighted average score of 80 out of 100, based on 44 critics, indicating "generally favorable reviews".

Brian Tallerico of RogerEbert.com gave the film  stars, saying "I marveled at the humanist depth of the world Haigh creates, one that can only be rendered by a truly great writer and director, working near the top of his game." Austin Dale of INTO named the film the best of 2018 while grieving its modest box office returns, calling it "both the most American film of the year and the year’s toughest sell."

Accolades

References

External links
 
 
 
 

2017 films
2017 drama films
2010s coming-of-age drama films
British drama films
British coming-of-age drama films
American novels adapted into films
Film4 Productions films
2017 independent films
Films about runaways
Films directed by Andrew Haigh
Films shot in Oregon
Films shot in Portland, Oregon
Films set in Portland, Oregon
Films set in Wyoming
Films about orphans
Films about homelessness
Films about horses
2010s English-language films
2010s British films